Septoria darrowii is a species of fungus in the family Mycosphaerellaceae. It is a plant pathogen infecting caneberries.

References

darrowii
Fungal plant pathogens and diseases
Small fruit diseases
Fungi described in 1916